The Central West Senior Hockey League (CWSHL) was a senior A ice hockey league in Newfoundland and Labrador, Canada.  The league competed for the Herder Memorial Trophy and its teams declared themselves eligible for the Allan Cup.

History
On June 4, 2014 four teams from the Newfoundland Senior Hockey League, the Clarenville Caribous, Western Royals, Gander Flyers and the Grand Falls-Windsor Cataracts, officially announced their departure and formed a new league to be the Central West Senior Hockey League (CWSHL).

On February 25, 2015, Hockey Newfoundland and Labrador approved a request by the Central West Senior Hockey League in which they asked to play for the historic Herder Trophy because it was the only operating Senior A hockey league registered in the province.

Hockey NL announced on September 20, 2015 that beginning in March 2016 the CWSHL champions will play the Avalon East Senior Hockey League champions in a best-of-five Herder final series.

Teams

Champions
2015 Grand Falls-Windsor Cataracts

League trophies and awards

First Place in Regular Season

Top Scorer in Regular Season

Top Goaltender Award

Herder Champions
2015 Grand Falls-Windsor Cataracts

References

External links
Official Website
defunct NLSHL Website
AESHL Website
Newfoundland Hockey Talk discussion pages

Ice hockey in Newfoundland and Labrador
Ice hockey leagues in Newfoundland and Labrador
Senior ice hockey